The Ship Money Act 1640 (16 Car 1 c 14) was an Act of the Parliament of England. It outlawed the medieval tax called ship money, a tax the sovereign could levy (on coastal towns) without parliamentary approval. Ship money was intended for use in war, but by the 1630s was being used to fund everyday government expenses of King Charles I, thereby subverting Parliament.

The whole Act, so far as unrepealed, was repealed by section 1 of, and Part I of the Schedule to, the Statute Law (Repeals) Act 1969.

Section 2
This section, from "it is" to first "aforesaid" was repealed by section 1 of, and Part I of the Schedule to, the Statute Law Revision Act 1888.

References
Halsbury's Statutes,

See also 
 Ship money
 R v Hampden (1637) 3 Howell State Trials 825

Acts of the Parliament of England
1640 in England
1640 in law
Economy of Stuart England